Emakhazeni Local Municipality (formerly Highlands Local Municipality) is located in the Nkangala District Municipality of Mpumalanga province, South Africa. The seat of Emakhazeni Local Municipality is Emakhazeni.

Main places
The 2011 census divided the municipality into the following main places:

Politics 

The municipal council consists of fifteen members elected by mixed-member proportional representation. Eight councillors are elected by first-past-the-post voting in eight wards, while the remaining seven are chosen from party lists so that the total number of party representatives is proportional to the number of votes received. In the election of 1 November 2021 the African National Congress (ANC) won a majority of ten seats on the council.

The following table shows the results of the election.

References

External links 
 Official homepage

Local municipalities of the Nkangala District Municipality